German Christians were a pressure group and a movement within the German Evangelical Church that existed between 1932 and 1945, aligned towards the antisemitic, racist and Führerprinzip ideological principles of Nazism with the goal to align German Protestantism as a whole towards those principles. Their advocacy of these principles led to a schism within 23 of the initially 28 regional church bodies (Landeskirchen) in Germany and the attendant foundation of the opposing Confessing Church in 1934.

History

Antecedents

Lutheranism

Imperial Germany
During the period of the German Empire, before the Weimar Republic, the Protestant churches (Landeskirchen) in Germany were divided along state and provincial borders. Each state or provincial church was supported by and affiliated with the regnal house—if it was Protestant—in its particular region; the crown provided financial and institutional support to its church. Church and state were therefore, to a large extent, combined on a regional basis. Monarchies of Roman Catholic dynasties also organised church bodies that were territorially defined by their state borders. The same was true for the three republican German states within the pre-1918 Empire. In Alsace-Lorraine the Napoleonic system of établissements publics du culte for the Calvinist, Jewish, Lutheran and Roman Catholic congregations and umbrellas remained in effect.

Austria-Hungary
Karl Lueger's antisemitic Christian Social Party is sometimes viewed as a model for Adolf Hitler's Nazism. Hitler praised Lueger in his book Mein Kampf as an inspiration. In 1943, Nazi Germany produced the biographical film Vienna 1910 about Lueger, which was given the predicate "special political value".

Weimar Republic
With the end of World War I and the resulting political and social turmoil, the regional churches lost their secular rulers. With revolutionary fervor in the air, the conservative church leaders had to contend with socialists who favored disestablishment.

After considerable political maneuvering, state churches were abolished (in name) under Weimar, but the anti-disestablishmentarians prevailed in substance: churches remained public corporations and retained their subsidies from government. Religious instruction in the schools continued, as did the theological faculties in the universities. The rights formerly held by the princes in the German Empire simply devolved to church councils.

Accordingly, in this initial period of the Weimar Republic, the Protestant Church in Germany now operated as a federation of 28 regional (or provincial) churches. The federation operated officially through the representative German Evangelical Church Confederation (Deutscher Evangelischer Kirchenbund (DEKB)); the League was itself established in 1922 by the rather loose annual convention called Church General Assembly (Kirchentag), which was composed of the members of the various regional churches. The League was governed and administered by a 36-member Executive Committee (Kirchenausschuss) which was responsible for ongoing governance between the annual conventions of the Kirchentag.

Save for the organizational matters under the jurisdiction of the national League, the regional churches remained independent in other matters, including theology, and the federal system allowed for a great deal of regional autonomy.

Nazi Germany

Ideology
The Deutsche Christen were, for the most part, a "group of fanatically Nazi Protestants." They began as an interest group and eventually came to represent one of the schismatic factions of German Protestantism.

Their movement was sustained and encouraged by factors such as:
 the 400th anniversary (in 1917) of Martin Luther's publication of the Ninety-five Theses in 1517, an event which endorsed German nationalism, stoked hostility toward foreign peoples, granted Germany a preferred place in the Protestant tradition, and legitimized antisemitism;
 the antisemitic writings of Martin Luther; cf. On the Jews and Their Lies;
 the Luther Renaissance Movement of Professor Emmanuel Hirsch; supported by publications by Guida Diehl, the first speaker of the National Socialist Women's League;
 the revival of völkisch traditions;
 the de-emphasis of the Old Testament in Lutheran theology, and the partial or total removal of Jewishness from the Bible;
 the respect for temporal (secular) authority, which had been emphasized by Luther. The movement used scriptural support (Romans 13) to justify this position.

The Deutsche Christen were sympathetic to the Nazi regime's goal of "co-ordinating" (see Gleichschaltung) the individual Protestant churches into a single and uniform Reich church, consistent with the Volk ethos and the Führerprinzip.

The editor Prof. Wilhelm Knevels of the journal Christentum und Leben (i.e. Christianity and Life) also worked for the "Institute for Research and the Elimination of Jewish influence on German Church Life"—and his journal published articles like "Heroic Christianity" ("Heroisches Christentum", 1935) and "Why not only God? Why Jesus?" ("Warum nicht nur Gott? Warum Jesus?", April 1942).

The "Martin Luther Memorial Church" (Martin-Luther-Gedächtniskirche), which was built in Berlin from 1933 to 1935 included a pulpit that showed the Sermon on the Mount with a Stahlhelm-wearing Wehrmacht soldier listening to Jesus and a baptismal font which featured an SA stormtrooper. The swastikas were removed after the war and the former church has been reconstructed as a memorial to Nazi crimes against humanity.

Under the authority of Alfred Rosenberg and his religious theories the Protestant minister  established an Institute of Religious Studies as part of the Advanced School of the NSDAP.

Formation
The Deutsche Christen were organized as a Kirchenpartei (church party, i.e. a nominating group) in 1931 to help win elections of presbyteries and synods (i.e. legislating church assemblies) in the Evangelical Church of the old-Prussian Union, the largest of the independent Landeskirchen. They were led by Ludwig Müller, a rather incompetent "old fighter" who had no particular leadership skills or qualifications, except having been a longtime faithful Nazi. He was advised by Emanuel Hirsch. In 1931 the book Salvation from chaotic madness by Guida Diehl, the first speaker of the National Socialist Women's League, got an admiring review by the National Socialist Monthly—she was praised for fighting against the "ridicule of Christ" and "showing the way for German Christians". The Berlin section was founded by Wilhelm Kube in 1932. The group achieved no particular notoriety before the Nazi assumption of political power in January 1933. In the Prussian church elections of November 1932, Deutsche Christen won one-third of the vote.

Hitler was appointed Chancellor on 30 January 1933 and the process of Gleichschaltung was in its full sway in the first few months of the regime. In late April 1933 the leadership of the 1922-founded German Evangelical Church Confederation, in the spirit of the new regime, agreed to write a new constitution for a brand new, unitary "national" church, which would be called the German Evangelical Church (Deutsche Evangelische Kirche or DEK). The new and unified national DEK would completely replace and supersede the old federated church with its representative league.

This church reorganization had been a goal of the Deutsche Christen for some time, as such a centralization would enhance the coordination of Church and State, as a part of the overall Nazi process of Gleichschaltung. The Deutsche Christen agitated for Müller to be elected as the new Church's bishop (Reichsbischof).

Bishopric
Müller had poor political skills, little political support within the Church and no real qualifications for the job, other than his commitment to Nazism and a desire to exercise power. When the federation council met in May 1933 to approve the new constitution, it elected Friedrich von Bodelschwingh as Reichsbischof of the new Protestant Reich Church by a wide margin, largely on the advice and support of the church leadership.

Hitler was infuriated with the rejection of his candidate, and things began to change. By June 1933 the Deutsche Christen had gained leadership of some Landeskirchen within the DEK and were, of course, supported by Nazi propaganda in their efforts to reverse the humiliating loss to Bodelschwingh. After a series of Nazi-directed political maneuvers, Bodelschwingh resigned and Müller was appointed as the new Reichsbischof in July 1933.

Aryan paragraph
Further pro-Nazi developments followed the elevation of Müller to the DEK bishopric: in late summer the old-Prussian general synod (led by Müller) adopted the Aryan paragraph, effectively defrocking clergy of Jewish descent and even clergy married to non-Aryans.

With their Gleichschaltungspolitik and their attempts to incorporate the Aryan paragraph into the church constitution so as to exclude Jewish Christians, the Deutsche Christen entered into a Kirchenkampf with other evangelical Christians.  Their opponents founded the Confessing Church in 1934, which condemned the Deutsche Christen as heretics and claimed to be the true German Protestant Church.

Impact

The Nazis found the Deutsche Christen group useful during the initial consolidation of power, but removed most of its leaders from their posts shortly afterwards; Reichsbischof Müller continued until 1945, but his power was effectively removed in favor of a government agency as a result of his obvious incompetence.

The Deutsche Christen were supportive of the Nazi ideas about race. They issued public statements that Christians in Germany with Jewish ancestors "remain Christians in a New Testament sense, but are not German Christians." They also supported the Nazi party platform's advocacy of a "Positive Christianity" that did not stress the belief in human sinfulness. Some went so far as to call for the total removal of all Jewish elements from the Bible, including the Old Testament. Their symbol was a traditional Christian cross with a swastika in the middle and the group's German initials "D" and "C".

It was claimed and remembered by the Deutsche Christen, as a "fact", that the Jews had killed Christ, which appealed to and actively encouraged existing anti-Semitic sentiments among Christians in Nazi Germany.

Precursors

19th century
The forerunner of the Deutsche Christen ideology came from certain Protestant groups of the German Empire. These groups sought a return to perceived völkisch, nationalistic and racist ideas within traditional Christianity, and looked to turn Christianity in Germany into a reformed intrinsic folk-religion. They found their model in the Berlin Hofprediger Adolf Stoecker, who was politically active and tried to position the Christian working-classes and lower-middle-classes against what he perceived as Jewish Überfremdung.

The Bayreuther Blätter devoted its June 1892 issue to a memorial of Paul de Lagarde and it emphatically recommended his work to its readers. Ludwig Schemann, one of the most prolific of Bayreuth Germanics and racists, and later the author of a full-length biography of Lagarde, summarized his life and work and concluded that "for the comprehension of Lagarde's whole being one must above all remember that he always considered himself the prophet and guide of his people — which of course he actually was." For Schemann his legacy consisted largely of his struggle against the Jews: "Not since the days of Schopenhauer and Wagner is the German thinker so mightily opposed this alien people, which desecrates our holy possessions, poisons our people, and seeks to wrest our property from us so as to completely trample on us, as Lagarde has" It was this image of Lagarde, the anti-Semitic prophet of a purified and heroic Germany, which the political Wagnerites and the Bayreuther Blätter kept alive. Houston Stewart Chamberlain, Wagner's son-in-law and intellectual disciple, wrote: "For us, the Deutsche Schriften have for a long time belonged to our most precious books, and we consider Lagarde's unabashed exposure of the inferiority of Semitic religious instincts and the pernicious effects on Christianity as an achievement that deserves our admiration and gratitude."

In 1896 Arthur Bonus advocated a "Germanization of Christianity". Max Bewer alleged in his 1907 book Der deutsche Christus (The German Christ), Jesus stemmed from German soldiers in the Roman garrison in Galilee and his preaching showed the influence of "German blood". He concluded that the Germans were the best Christians among all peoples, only prevented from the full flowering of their spiritual faculties by the materialistic Jews. Julius Bode, however, concluded that the Christianisation of the Germans was the imposition of an "un-German" religious understanding, and that Germanic feeling remained alien to it and so should remain exempt from it.

20th century
On the 400th anniversary of the Protestant Reformation, in 1917, the Flensburg pastor Friedrich Andersen, the writer Adolf Bartels and Hans Paul Freiherr von Wolzogen presented 95 Thesen on which a "German Christianity on a Protestant basis" should be founded.  It stated:

For the authors of the Thesen, the "angry thunder-god" Jehovah was the same as the "Father" and "[Holy] Ghost", that Christ preached and that the Germans would have guessed.  Childlike confidence in God and selfless love was, to them, the essence of the Germanic "people's-soul" in contrast to Jewish "menial fear of God" and "materialistic morality."  Church was not an "institution for the dissemination of Judaism", and they felt religious and confirmation materials should no longer teach the Old Testament and the Ten Commandments, nor even the New Testament, which they held to be of Jewish influence that had to be "cleaned" so that the child Jesus could be used as a model for "self sacrifice" and "male heroism".

In 1920 minister Karl Gerecke published Biblical anti-Semitism in the Volksverlag of Ernst Boepple, one of the founders of the German Workers' Party.

Dietrich Eckart, an early mentor of Adolf Hitler, also emphasized the "manliness" of Jesus Christ and compared him to the Norse god Baldr.

In 1921 Andersen wrote Der deutsche Heiland (The German Saviour), in which he opposed Jewish migration as an apocalyptic decision:

Against the "contamination by Jewish ideas", mainly from the Old Testament, the Churches and Germany should (he argued) be "mutually benefits and supports", and then Christianity would win back its status as "a religion of the Volk and of the struggle" and "the great exploiter of humanity, the evil enemy of our Volk [would] finally be destroyed".

In the same year, 1921, the Protestant-dominated and völkisch-oriented League for German Churches was founded in Berlin.  Andersen, pastor Ernst Bublitz and teacher Kurd Joachim Niedlich brought out the twice-monthly The German Church magazine, which in 12,000 articles advanced the Bund'''s ideas.  Jesus should be a "tragic-Nordic figure" against the Old Testament's "religious idea", with the Old Testament replaced by a "German myth".  Each biblical story was to be "measured under German feelings, so that German Christianity escapes from Semitic influence as Beelzebub did before the Cross."

In 1925 groups such as the Bund united with ten völkisch, Germanophile and anti-Semitic organizations to form the German Christian Working Group.  The Christian-Spirit Religious Society, founded in 1927 in Nuremberg by Artur Dinter, saw more effect in the churches, striving for the 'de-Judification' and the building of a non-denominational People's Church.

The proposed abolition of the Old Testament was in part fiercely opposed among Christian German nationalists, seeing it as a racist attack on the foundations of their faith from inside and outside. The theologian Johannes Schneider, a member of the German National People's Party ( or DNVP) (a party fairly close to the political aims of the NSDAP), wrote in 1925:

In 1927 the Protestant Church League reacted to the growing radicalization of German Christian groups with a Churches Day in Königsberg, aiming to clarify Christianity's relation to "Fatherland", "Nation", "Volkstum", "Blood" and "Race".  Many local church-officers tried to delineate, such as with regards to racism, but this only served to show how deeply it had intruded into their thinking. Paul Althaus, for example, wrote:

On this basis, the radical German-Christians' ideas were hardly slowed down.  In 1928 they gathered in Thuringia to found the Thuringian German Christians' Church Movement, seeking contact with the Nazi party and naming their newsletter "Letters to German Christians".

Pagan and anti-Christian trends
Alfred Rosenberg's book The Myth of the Twentieth Century resonated in these circles and gave them renewed impetus.  His polemic against all "un-German" and "root-stock" elements in Christianity was directed against the Christianity and the denominational organisations of the time. Marxism and Catholic Internationalism were attacked as two facets of the Jewish spirit, and Rosenberg stated the need for a new national religion to complete the Reformation.

The Associated German Religious Movement, founded in Eisenach at the end of 1933, was also an attempt to create a national religion outside and against the churches.  It combined six earlier Nordic-völkisch oriented groups and a further five groups were represented by individual members. Jakob Wilhelm Hauer became the group's "leader and representative" by acclamation, and other members included the philosopher Ernst Bergmann (1881–1945), the racial ideologue Hans F. K. Günther, the writer Ernst Graf zu Reventlow, the historian Herman Wirth, Ludwig Fahrenkrog and Lothar Stengel-von Rutkowski.

Attempts to "de-Judaize" the Bible

In 1939 with the approval of eleven of the German Protestant regional churches the Eisenacher Institute for the Study and Elimination of Jewish Influence on German Church Life (called the "Dejudaization Institute") was founded, led by Siegfried Leffler and Walter Grundmann. One of its main tasks was to compile a "People's Testament" in the sense of what Alfred Rosenberg called a "Fifth Gospel", to announce the myth of the "Aryan Jesus".  It became clear in 1994 that the Testament's poetic text was written by the famous ballad-poet and proprietor of the Eugen-Diederichs-Verlag, . Despite broad church support for it (even many Confessing Christians advocated such an approach, in the hope that the disaffiliation of 1937 to 1940 could be curbed), the first edition of the text did not meet with the expected enthusiastic response.

After 1945
After 1945, the remaining German Christian currents formed smaller communities and circles distanced from the newly formed umbrella of the independent church bodies Evangelical Church in Germany.  German Christian-related parties sought to influence the historiography of the Kirchenkampf in the so-called "church-historical working group", but they had little effect from then on in theology and politics.  Other former members of the German Christians moved into the numerically insignificant religious communities known as the Free People's Christian Church and the People's Movement of Free Church Christians after 1945.

In 1980, in the context of a statement entitled "Towards Renovation of the Relationship of Christians and Jews (Zur Erneuerung des Verhältnisses von Christen und Juden), the Synod of the Evangelical Church in the Rhineland stated that it recognized and "confess, with dismay, the co-responsibility and guilt of German Christians for the Holocaust." On May 6, 2019, eighty years after the founding of the “Dejudaization Institute”, the “Dejudaization Institute“ Memorial” was unveiled in Eisenach at the behest of eight Protestant regional churches. It is intended to be understood as the Protestant churches’ confession of guilt and as a memorial to the victims of the church’s anti-Judaism and anti-Semitism.

 See also 
 Ariosophy
 Christian Identity
 Esoteric Nazism
 The Foundations of the Nineteenth Century German Faith Movement
 Institute for the Study and Elimination of Jewish Influence on German Church Life
 List of white nationalist organizations
 Marcion of Sinope
 Race and appearance of Jesus
 Positive Christianity
 Religious aspects of Nazism
 Religious views of Adolf Hitler

Notes and references

Bibliography
English
 
 
 
   (Bergen)
 Jochen Birkenmeier, Michael Weise (2020): Study and Eradication. The Church’s „Dejudaization Institute“, 1939–1945. Companion Volume to the Exhibition, Stiftung Lutherhaus Eisenach: Eisenach. 
 
 
 
 
 

German
 Friedrich Baumgärtel: Wider die Kirchenkampflegenden; Freimund Verlag 19762 (19591), 
 Otto Diem: Der Kirchenkampf. Evangelische Kirche und Nationalsozialismus; Hamburg 19702
 Heiner Faulenbach: Artikel Deutsche Christen; in: 4, 1999
 Rainer Lächele: Ein Volk, ein Reich, ein Glaube. Die „Deutschen Christen“ in Württemberg 1925–1960; Stuttgart 1994
 Kurt Meier: Die Deutschen Christen; Halle 1964 [Standardwerk]
 Kurt Meier: Kreuz und Hakenkreuz. Die evangelische Kirche im Dritten Reich; Munich 20012
 Klaus Scholder: Die Kirchen und das Dritte ReichVolume 1: Vorgeschichte und Zeit der Illusionen, 1918–1934; Berlin 1977
Volume 2: Das Jahr der Ernüchterung 1934; Berlin 1985
 Günther van Norden u.a. (ed.): Wir verwerfen die falsche Lehre. Arbeits- und Lesebuch zur Barmer Theologischen Erklärung Marikje Smid: Deutscher Protestantismus und Judentum 1932–33; München: Christian Kaiser, 1990; 
 Hans Prolingheuer: Kleine politische Kirchengeschichte. 50 Jahre evangelischer Kirchenkampf; Cologne: Pahl-Rugenstein, 1984; 
 Joachim Beckmann (ed.s): Kirchliches Jahrbuch für die evangelische Kirche in Deutschland 1933–1945. It: Evangelische Kirche im Dritten Reich, Gütersloh 1948
 Julius Sammetreuther: Die falsche Lehre der Deutschen Christen; Bekennende Kirche Heft 15; Munich 19343
 Leonore Siegele-Wenschkewitz (ed.): Christlicher Antijudaismus und Antisemitismus. Theologische und kirchliche Programme Deutscher Christen; Arnoldshainer Texte Band 85; Frankfurt/M.: Haag + Herchen Verlag, 1994; 
it (S. 201–234) Birgit Jerke: Wie wurde das Neue Testament zu einem sogenannten Volkstestament „entjudet“? Aus der Arbeit des Eisenacher „Instituts zur Erforschung und Beseitung des jüdischen Einflusses auf das deutsch kirchliche Leben“ Karl Heussi: Kompendium der Kirchengeschichte''; Tübingen: Mohr, 198116; ; S. 521–528

External links

  Religion in the service of an ethno-nationalist construction of identity: discussions on the examples of the "German Christians" and Japanese Shinto 
 
  Die evangelische Kirche und der Holocaust
  Humanist.de: Die christlichen Wurzeln des Nationalsozialismus
  Andreas Herzog: „Wider den jüdischen Geist“. Christian Anti-Semitic arguments 1871–1933

Nazi Party organizations
Nazi Germany and Protestantism
Christian organizations established in 1932
Christian movements
Late modern Christian antisemitism
Kirchenkampf
Protestant denominations established in the 20th century